Malama Meleisea is a Samoan historian and the author of several historical books on Samoa. He holds the Samoan title Leasiolagi.

Meleisea is from Poutasi in Falealili. He worked as a teacher before studying at the University of Papua New Guinea and Australian National University. He holds a Phd in History and Politics from Macquarie University in Sydney, Australia. In 1978 he became a lecturer at the University of the South Pacific. He was the founding director of Macmillan Brown Centre for Pacific Studies at Canterbury University and director at Centre for Pacific Studies at Auckland University, New Zealand. 

In 2007 he was appointed UNESCO director in Bangladesh. Between 2011 and 2012 he served as a judge on the Land and Titles Court of Samoa. In 2016 he was appointed as one of the commissioners for a commission of inquiry into domestic violence in Samoa.

Meleisea is currently Director of Samoan Studies at the National University of Samoa,

Selected bibliography

References 

Living people
People from Atua (district)
Samoan historians
Land and Titles Court of Samoa judges
Year of birth missing (living people)
Academic staff of the University of the South Pacific
Academic staff of the National University of Samoa
University of Papua New Guinea alumni
Macquarie University alumni
 Australian National University alumni